"Si Tú la Ves" ("If You See Her") is a song recorded by American singer Nicky Jam featuring fellow Puerto Rican rapper Wisin. It was released on July 28, 2017, as the fourth single from Nicky Jam's fourth studio album, Fénix (2017). It was written by Nicky Jam, Wisin, Christian Mena, Jonathan Ballesteros, Juan Diego Medina Vélez and Jefferson Junior, and was produced by Nicky Jam, Wisin and Saga WhiteBlack. The single peaked at number 18 on the Billboard Hot Latin Songs chart.

Concept video
On February 10, 2017, Nicky Jam released a concept video for "Si Tú la Ves" on his YouTube account. The concept video features Nicky Jam sitting in a dark room watching his latest visual project for the song. It has so far been viewed over 170 million times.

Music video
The music video for "Si Tú la Ves" premiered on July 28, 2017 on Nicky Jam's YouTube account. It was directed by JP Valencia of 36 Grados and shot in Quito, Ecuador. It has so far been viewed over 340 million times.

Track listing

Charts

Weekly charts

Year-end charts

Certifications

Release history

References

2017 songs
2017 singles
Nicky Jam songs
Songs written by Nicky Jam
Spanish-language songs
Latin pop songs
Reggaeton songs
Sony Music Latin singles
Sony Music Colombia singles
RCA Records singles
Songs written by Wisin